Us is a 1991 television movie broadcast on CBS,  produced, written and directed by Michael Landon. Landon also starred in the film, along with Barney Martin and Casey Peterson. It was a pilot for what would have been Landon's fourth consecutive television series and his first for a network other than NBC; Landon's death that year precluded its going ahead, but the pilot aired as a posthumous tribute to Landon in September 1991.

Landon played Jeff Hayes, a man just released from prison after serving many years due to being wrongfully convicted of killing a wealthy man's wife.

References 
Review at Entertainment Weekly

External links 

Television films as pilots
1991 television films
1991 films
Columbia Pictures films
Films directed by Michael Landon
Films scored by Steve Dorff
Television pilots not picked up as a series
CBS network films